The 10th season of Law & Order premiered on NBC, September 22, 1999 alongside Law & Order: Special Victims Unit and ended May 24, 2000. Executive Producers René Balcer and Ed Sherin both left the show at the end of the season. This is the final season to feature Steven Hill as Adam Schiff, who was the last original cast member, to leave the series at the end of the 10th season.

Cast
This is the first season to feature Ed Green (played by Jesse L. Martin) who replaced seasons 6–9's Rey Curtis (Benjamin Bratt) in the role of junior detective. This season marked the first Law & Order spinoff, Law & Order: Special Victims Unit (Law & Order: SVU), which features Dann Florek reprising his role of Captain Donald Cragen from the first three seasons of Law & Order. Florek/Cragen appears in both parts of a two-part crossover between the two shows this season, and four other Law & Order: SVU characters appear in episodes of the original series over this season. Steven Hill, who played Adam Schiff, left the series at the end of the 10th season.

Main cast
Jerry Orbach as Senior Detective Lennie Briscoe
Jesse L. Martin as Junior Detective Ed Green
S. Epatha Merkerson as Lieutenant Anita Van Buren
Sam Waterston as Executive Assistant District Attorney Jack McCoy
Angie Harmon as Assistant District Attorney Abbie Carmichael
Steven Hill as District Attorney Adam Schiff

Recurring cast
Dann Florek as Captain Don Cragen
Carey Lowell as Defense Attorney Jamie Ross
Carolyn McCormick as Dr. Elizabeth Olivet
J. K. Simmons as Dr. Emil Skoda

Crossover Stars from Law & Order: Special Victims Unit
 Christopher Meloni as Detective Elliot Stabler
 Mariska Hargitay as Detective Olivia Benson
 Richard Belzer as Detective John Munch
 Michelle Hurd as Detective Monique Jeffries
 Dann Florek as Captain Don Cragen

Departure of Steven Hill
Steven Hill, who played Adam Schiff, was the last first-season member who left the series at the end of the 10th season and was replaced by Dianne Wiest.

Episodes

Notes

Jesse L. Martin joins the cast as Det. Ed Green in this season.
This is the final season to feature Steven Hill as Adam Schiff. Hill was the last original cast member to leave the series.
The Law & Order spinoff, Law & Order: Special Victims Unit, debuted at the time of this season.
This season features all five of the series' longest serving characters: Anita Van Buren (17 seasons), Jack McCoy (16 seasons), Lennie Briscoe (12 seasons), Adam Schiff (10 seasons) and Ed Green (9 seasons). Additionally, one member of the original cast of Law & Order: Special Victims Unit (Mariska Hargitay), who remains on the show to date, appears in the episode 'Entitled.' Christopher Meloni departed SVU in 2011, Richard Belzer in 2013, and Dann Florek in 2014.
"Entitled," episode 219, is a continuation of an SVU episode of the same name.
Adrienne Shelly guest-starred in the episode of 'Law & Order titled "High & Low" (Season 10) in which she portrayed the character Wendy Alston.  Shelly herself would later be murdered, which inspired the episode 'Melting Pot' (Season 17).

References

External links
Episode guide from NBC.com

10
1999 American television seasons
2000 American television seasons